Sreedhar Tigala Nayudu, simply known and credited as Sridhar TN, is a film director from Andhra Pradesh, India.

Early life
Sreedhar was born in Vizianagaram, Andhra Pradesh, India. His childhood days were spent in Hyderabad. He completed his Master's in Business Administration from Osmania University in 2005.

Career
Sreedhar started working in the film industry from 2012 by releasing his first film Janaaza. The film had to present newcomers as it was on a low scaled budget. The filming completed by the end of 2013 and in 2014, and it had a limited theatrical release.

From September 2016, Sreedhar is working as a director on the pre-production of his second film The Tailgater.

Sreedhar and Shameem Unissa Begum, a 45 year old conservative Muslim housewife got a special mention as their Documentary “MASLAA” (the incident) was India's entry to the Prestigious Documentary Film Festival (Al Jazeera Film Festival) to be held in Doha in 2017.

Filmography

References

External links 
 

Film directors from Andhra Pradesh
Living people
21st-century Indian film directors
Year of birth missing (living people)